São Paulo/Guarulhos – Governor André Franco Montoro International Airport , commonly known as São Paulo/Guarulhos International Airport, is the primary international airport serving São Paulo. It is popularly known locally as either Cumbica Airport, after the district where it is located and the Brazilian Air Force base that exists at the airport complex, or Guarulhos Airport, after the municipality of Guarulhos, in the state of São Paulo, where it is located. Since November 28, 2001, the airport has been named after André Franco Montoro (1916–1999), former Governor of São Paulo state. The airport was rebranded as GRU Airport in 2012.

The airport was the busiest in Brazil in terms of transported passengers, aircraft operations, and cargo handled in 2012, placing it as the second busiest airport in Latin America by passenger traffic (36,596,326 in 2016) after Mexico City International Airport. Guarulhos has slot restrictions, operating with a maximum of 45 operations/hour and being one of the five airports with such restrictions in Brazil (the others are São Paulo-Congonhas, Brasília, Belo Horizonte-Pampulha and Rio de Janeiro-Santos Dumont).

Since 2012, the airport has been operated by a consortium composed of Invepar S/A, Airports Company South Africa, and Infraero. 

Some of its facilities are shared with the São Paulo Air Force Base of the Brazilian Air Force.

History

On June 6, 1967, in response to the growth of air traffic in Brazil, the Brazilian military government initiated studies concerning the renovation of the airport infrastructure in Brazil. As part of the conclusions of these studies, because of their location, strategic importance, and security issues, new passenger facilities would be constructed in the areas of Galeão Air Force Base in Rio de Janeiro and São Paulo Air Force Base in São Paulo.

In relation to São Paulo, the initial planning of the airport involved three runways and four passenger terminals. However, the first phase of the construction comprising two runways and two terminals started only on August 11, 1980. The airport was officially inaugurated on January 20, 1985. Quickly Guarulhos became the city's primary airport, supplanting São Paulo–Congonhas Airport.

In 1989 the runways were extended and the terminals renovated, enlarged, and had their capacity increased from 7.5 million to 8.25 million passengers/year.

Construction of Terminal 3, capable of handling 12 million passengers per year, had been planned since 2001 but due to a myriad of political and economic problems, the actual construction didn't begin until 2011.

In 2010, the airport served more than 26.8 million passengers, an increase of 24% over 2009 and passenger volumes were 31% in excess of its capacity rated at 20.5 million per year at its present configuration.

In order to relieve the acute overcrowding at Terminals 1 and 2, Infraero announced on May 17, 2011 that the former cargo terminals of defunct airlines VASP and Transbrasil, later used by Federal Agencies, would undergo renovations and adaptations for use as domestic passenger terminals with remote boarding. This new terminal was initially called Terminal 4 (T4). The first phase of the renovations, comprising the former VASP terminal, opened on February 8, 2012, and the second phase, comprising the former Transbrasil terminal, was opened in June 2013. Contrary to what had been announced before, the new terminal will be permanent. Webjet was the first airline to use the new facility. The new terminal, in its first phase, increased the capacity of the airport in 5.5 million passengers/year and, in the second phase to 8 million passengers/year. In total, Guarulhos would then be able to handle 28.5 million passengers/year.

Following a decision made on April 26, 2011 by the Federal Government for private companies being granted concessions to explore some Infraero airports, on February 6, 2012, the administration of the airport was conceded, for 20 years, to the Consortium Invepar-ACSA composed by the Brazilian Invepar, an Investments and Funds Society (90%) and the South African ACSA – Airports Company South Africa (10%). Infraero, the state-run organisation, will remain with 49% of the shares of the company incorporated for the administration.

On December 2, 2015, the airport's terminals were renumbered. Former Terminal 4 was renumbered Terminal 1; former terminals 1 and 2, which were wings of a single building, became the new Terminal 2. Terminal 3 kept its numbering. The new numbering reflects the order by which terminals are reached when one arrives at the airport by the access road, and is expected to be less confusing in the long term. Check-in counters and gates were also renumbered, with the first digit being now the new terminal number.

On October 28, 2015, the National Civil Aviation Agency of Brazil (Anac) authorised Airbus A380 operations at Guarulhos Airport, effective four days later. The authorisation was granted after extensive works were conducted on the runways and taxiways (including widening runway 09L/27R to 60 metres) and special taxiing procedures were established. On November 14, 2015, Emirates operated a one-time special flight with the A380 on its Dubai-São Paulo route to commemorate its eight years of operations in Brazil.
On March 26, 2017, Emirates started daily A380 service from Dubai to São Paulo, replacing the Boeing 777-300ER previously used on that route – coincidentally, on the same day that the other UAE airline, Etihad, ended its services to São Paulo.

Facilities

Runways and taxiways
GRU has two parallel runways. Runway 10R/28L is mostly used for landings and runway 10L/28R for takeoffs. There are high-speed exit taxiways on both runways that allow for traffic to depart the runway at higher speed to allow better efficiency for landing and takeoff traffic. As of 2014, there was an average of 650 takeoff and landing operations per day at the airport.

Terminals
The airport has three passenger terminals, numbered 1, 2, and 3, according to their order along the airport access road when arriving from the city.

 Terminal 1 is the smallest and simplest. It has only domestic flights, and as of January 2020, only Azul operates there, as former Passaredo (now VoePass) has been moved to Terminal 2. Terminal 1 has no jet bridges and no direct access to the other terminals, which can only be reached by a free shuttle bus.
 Terminal 2 is the oldest and largest, and for many years was the sole airport terminal, although its two wings were considered different terminals at the time. It has the majority of domestic flights and to Latin American destinations, as well as a few intercontinental flights.
 Terminal 3 is the newest and most modern. It has only international flights and concentrates most long-haul intercontinental traffic, in addition to the LATAM Group's Latin American flights. Five of the terminal's gates can accommodate the Airbus A380.

Terminals 2 and 3 are directly linked by a walkway.

Navigational aids
There are two navigational aids that GRU traffic uses.

Developments
In 2009 Infraero unveiled a R$ 1,489.5 million (US$784.7 USD million; €549.8 EUR million) investment plan to upgrade Guarulhos International Airport, focusing on preparations for the 2014 FIFA World Cup and the Summer Olympics in 2016. The investment was supposed to be used as follows:

Construction of additional taxiways. Cost: R$ 19M. Completion: April 2016.
Enlargement of apron and taxiways. Cost: R$370,5M. Completion: May 2016.
Construction of passenger Terminal 3. Cost: R$1,100M. Completed: March 2014. Opened for Star Alliance airlines in May.

Central to this investment plan was Terminal 3, which is projected to add 12 million passenger capacity to the 17 million of the existing two terminals. Plans for a third runway were decided to be "technically impracticable" and were cancelled in January 2008.

However, the former concessionary, Infraero, experienced many legal and bureaucratic difficulties, which prevented most (if any) of these improvements from being completed on schedule. As of April 2013, the new concessionary unveiled a new expansion project, which included the new Terminal 3 (with a different design than the one proposed by Infraero), the widening of the main runway in order to enable operations by the large Airbus A380 and Boeing 747-8, operated by Emirates and Lufthansa respectively, and several other improvements in the existing terminals and parking area.

Terminal 3 is open and all Star Alliance airlines are in, as well as many other overseas carriers. International flights by LATAM also use the facility.

A train service development and construction has also been planned, however never concluded and cancelled. This included an Airport Express Line linking the airport to downtown São Paulo and a Rio–São Paulo high-speed rail connecting Guarulhos to Rio de Janeiro-Galeão and Campinas-Viracopos airports.

Since March 2017 American Airlines invested US$ 100 million on a  maintenance hangar at Guarulhos Airport, building together with the LATAM Hangar of R$ 130 million. The American Airlines one is capable of performing line maintenance on two wide-body aircraft at the same time, of the types commonly used by the U.S. company on routes between São Paulo and the United States and the LATAM one is capable of performing line maintenance of one wide-body aircraft. It could also be used by other companies as storage for parts. The same conditions applies to the LATAM maintenance center.

Airlines and destinations

Passenger

Cargo

Statistics

Busiest routes

Accidents and incidents
 On January 28, 1986, a VASP Boeing 737-2A1 registered PP-SME flying from Guarulhos to Belo Horizonte unknowingly tried to take-off from Guarulhos, during foggy conditions, from a taxiway. The take-off was aborted, but the aircraft overran, collided with a dyke and broke in two. One passenger died.
 On March 21, 1989, a Transbrasil cargo Boeing 707-349C registered PT-TCS operating flight 801, flying from Manaus to São Paulo-Guarulhos, crashed at the district of Vila Barros in Guarulhos, shortly before touch-down at runway 09R. That day, at 12:00, the runway was going to be closed for maintenance and the crew decided to speed up procedures to touch-down before closure (it was already 11:54). In a hurry, one of the crew members, by mistake, activated the air-dynamic brakes, and the aircraft lost too much speed to have enough aerodynamic support (resulting in a stall). There were 25 fatalities, of which three were crew members and 22 were civilians on the ground. As well as the 22 fatalities, there were over 200 injured on the ground.
On March 2, 1996, a Madrid Táxi Aéreo Gates Learjet 25D registered PT-LSD transporting the Brazilian band Mamonas Assassinas crashed into Cantareira mountain range, located north of the airport, at 23:16 local time killing all 9 passengers on board. The aircraft was on final approach to land on the runway 09R, but went around. Ironically, all band members were from a Guarulhos neighborhood located close to the airport.  
On September 14, 2002, a Total Linhas Aéreas ATR42-312 registered PT-MTS on a cargo flight between São Paulo-Guarulhos and Londrina crashed while en route near Paranapanema. The crew of 2 died.

Access

Car
The airport has its own highway system: Rodovia Hélio Smidt Highway which connects the airport to Presidente Dutra Highway or Ayrton Senna Highway. Residents of Guarulhos can access the road via Monteiro Lobato Avenue. Taxi stands are located outside each of the two terminals on the Arrivals level; inside there are car rental agency representatives.

Bus
Bus transportation is available through the Airport Bus Service, an executive bus line, administered by EMTU and operated by Consórcio Internorte – Área 3. This service provides transportation connecting Guarulhos to Congonhas airport; to Tietê Bus Terminal; to Palmeiras-Barra Funda Intermodal Terminal, to Faria Lima Ave; To Republica Square (Praça da República); To Berrini Ave., Itaim Bibi district; and to the circuit of hotels along Paulista Avenue and Rua Augusta. The ride takes about one hour, depending on traffic. At the airport, tickets can be purchased at the counter located outside the lounge of the Terminal 1, Wing B's arrivals level.

Pássaro Marron/EMTU, a syndicate of the Internorte Consortium, offers two regular bus lines, 257 and 299, connecting Tatuapé subway station (Line 3-Red) with Guarulhos Airport every 30 minutes. At Tatuapé, both buses can be picked up on a platform of that multimodal station's North side bus terminal. At the airport, the stop for both buses is at the Arrivals level road connecting the wings of Terminal 2.

Gol Airlines and LATAM offer for their passengers free bus transfers between Guarulhos and Congonhas airports at regular times.

Viação Cometa offers daily departures to and from the airport and the cities of Santos, Sorocaba, São Vicente, and Praia Grande. Lirabus operates daily buses between the airport and Campinas. Pássaro Marron offers bus services to São José dos Campos with departures every two hours. Viação Transdutra connects the airport with the city of Arujá.

Rail

Line 13-Jade of the São Paulo commuter rail system, operated by CPTM, connects with the airport through Aeroporto-Guarulhos Station. This line started its operations experimentally on March 31, 2018. The line was opened initially on a trial phase and operates only on Saturdays and Sundays from 10 a.m. to 3 p.m., with trains every 30 minutes to the suburban station of Engenheiro Goulart in eastern São Paulo city, from where a further connection with CPTM's line 12 and at least another one by subway will be necessary to reach downtown and the main business areas. Service will be expanded in May 2018 to seven days a week, but still only from 10 a.m. to 3 p.m. Full service from 4 a.m. to midnight is expected in late June 2018.

Additionally, since December 2020 there's the Airport Express service, from Luz station to Aeroporto-Guarulhos, departing from each termini station every hour. It attends only one station towards Aeroporto-Guarulhos (Guarulhos-CECAP station), and 2 stations towards Luz (Guarulhos-CECAP and Brás).

Aeroporto-Guarulhos station is opposite to Terminal 1, which is Guarulhos Airport's smallest and least busy, and not linked to the other terminals except by a shuttle bus. The GRU Airport company reportedly vetoed a station closer to much busier Terminals 2 and 3 because it intended to build a shopping mall at the proposed location. The excessive number of complicated train changes through crowded commuter rail and subway lines, and the added inconvenience of the shuttle bus from Terminal 1 for most passengers, especially carrying luggage, has attracted criticism to the São Paulo state government, responsible for São Paulo's subway and commuter rail systems, which has been accused of flawed planning and overindulgence with the airport's private concessionaire.

To solve this situation, Governor João Doria and State Secretary of Metropolitan Transports Alexandre Baldy proposed a people mover to connect the CPTM station directly to the airport, estimated to be opened in May 2021. However, many delays prevented the construction of the line, which should be owned and fully operated by GRU Airport. In November 2020, the Brazilian federal government, through the Ministry of Infrastructure, authorized the construction of the people mover, which should cost R$ 175 million (approximately US$ 47.7 million in 2019).

In December 2020 it was announced that Brazilian firm Aerom, which owns the Aeromovel technology, had been selected to install the system.  Construction was due to begin in January 2021 with completing in 2022.  In June 2021 it was announced that the project had 'advanced' but a schedule for construction had not been finalised.

See also
List of airports in Brazil
São Paulo Air Force Base

References

External links

Airports in São Paulo (state)
 
 
Airports established in 1985
1985 establishments in Brazil